Titchfield Carnival is an annual event that has been held in Titchfield, Hampshire, England, every year since 1880 onwards, except during World War I and World War II and 2007. It is organised each year by the Titchfield Bonfire Boys Society, and features a parade through the village, a funfair, a variety of floats, fireworks, and a bonfire. The carnival is also famous for its beauty Queen competition that attracts young girls from all across the town.

References

,

External links
 Titchfield Bonfire Boys Society

Carnivals in the United Kingdom
Titchfield